Lee Sang-gi may refer to:
 Lee Sang-ki (fencer) (born 1966), South Korean male épée fencer
 Lee Sang-gi (footballer, born 1987), South Korean football goalkeeper
 Lee Sang-gi (footballer, born 1996), South Korean football defender